Laponia is a historical Finnish Province in the north of Finland. The present-day Finnish region, modern province of Lapland contains also an Ostrobothnian area called Peräpohjola outside of the historical Laponia. The historical province formed a part of a larger Swedish historical province of Laponia before Finland was ceded to Russia in September 1809.

See also 
 Sápmi

Historical provinces of Finland